The chosa herring, Clupea pallasii suworowi, is a subspecies of the Pacific herring, Clupea pallasii, in the genus Clupea of the family Clupeidae.

References

External links

Clupeidae
Commercial fish
Fish described in 1927